The GIFT (General Import Format Template) format is a "wiki-like" markup language for describing tests, originally proposed by Paul Shew in 2003. It is associated with the Moodle course management system.

Question types in GIFT
GIFT allows someone to use a text editor to write multiple-choice, true-false, short answer, matching, missing word and numerical questions in a simple format that can be imported to a computer-based quizzes. The content is an UTF-8-encoded text file.

Example:
//Comment line 
::Question title 
:: Question {
     =A correct answer
     ~Wrong answer1
     #A response to wrong answer1
     ~Wrong answer2
     #A response to wrong answer2
     ~Wrong answer3
     #A response to wrong answer3
     ~Wrong answer4
     #A response to wrong answer4
}

See also
 QTI

Notes

External links
 http://docs.moodle.org/en/GIFT - description of the format
 http://microformats.org/wiki/gift - includes proposals for extension

Computer file formats